Natoya Goule-Topping (born 30 March 1991) is a Jamaican middle-distance runner. In the 800 metres she is the 2019 Pan American Games champion, 2018 NACAC Championship silver medallist, and 2018 Commonwealth Games bronze medallist. Goule is the current Jamaican record holder at the event both out- and indoors, and also for the indoor 1000 metres.

She has represented Jamaica on numerous occasions, including both the 2016 Rio Olympics and 2020 Tokyo Olympics.

Running career

Youth
Goule established herself in athletics already by the age of 12, when she ran at the ISSA Athletic Championships in Jamaica. Representing Manchester High School, she holds records in the Girls' Class 1 1500m as well as the Class 3 800m, and she has accumulated 15 individual gold medals at the Inter-Secondary Schools Boys and Girls Championships, and 12 individual at the CARIFTA Games.

International
Goule first attended South Plains College and ran for their track team. At around the same time South Plains was already recruiting other Jamaican runners, such as Kemoy Campbell. Eventually, however, she would go on to study and run at Louisiana State University. After a few seasons at LSU she transferred to Clemson.

In 2014, racing in the heats, she was a member of Jamaica's women's 4x400 relay team which won the silver medal at the 2014 IAAF World Indoor Championships.

Goule-Topping won races at numerous meetings; for example, in 2022 alone, she won two 800 metres indoor events (NY New Balance Indoor Grand Prix, and World Indoor Tour's Meeting Hauts-de-France Pas-de-Calais where she improved her Jamaican indoor record to 1:58.46), and one 1000 metres indoor event (Clemson Invitational, Clemson, SC).

She placed fourth at the World Indoor Championships in Belgrade with a time of 2:01.18.

Achievements

International competitions

Other competitions

References

External links

 

1991 births
Living people
Jamaican female middle-distance runners
People from Manchester Parish
Athletes (track and field) at the 2014 Commonwealth Games
Athletes (track and field) at the 2018 Commonwealth Games
World Athletics Championships athletes for Jamaica
LSU Lady Tigers track and field athletes
Athletes (track and field) at the 2016 Summer Olympics
Olympic athletes of Jamaica
Commonwealth Games medallists in athletics
Commonwealth Games bronze medallists for Jamaica
Athletes (track and field) at the 2019 Pan American Games
Pan American Games gold medalists for Jamaica
Pan American Games bronze medalists for Jamaica
Pan American Games medalists in athletics (track and field)
Jamaican Athletics Championships winners
World Athletics Indoor Championships medalists
Pan American Games gold medalists in athletics (track and field)
Medalists at the 2019 Pan American Games
Athletes (track and field) at the 2020 Summer Olympics
20th-century Jamaican women
21st-century Jamaican women
Medallists at the 2018 Commonwealth Games